Dorcadion circumcinctum is a species of beetle in the family Cerambycidae. It was described by Chevrolat in 1862.

Subspecies
 Dorcadion circumcinctum ariasi Chevrolat, 1862
 Dorcadion circumcinctum circumcinctum Chevrolat, 1862

See also 
Dorcadion

References

circumcinctum
Beetles described in 1862